This article lists the confirmed squads lists for badminton's 2018 Thomas & Uber Cup. Rankings stated are based on BWF World Ranking for 3 May 2018.

Thomas Cup

Group A

China

India

France

Australia

Group B

Indonesia

South Korea

Canada

Thailand

Group C

Chinese Taipei

Japan

Germany

Hong Kong

Group D

Denmark

Malaysia

Russia

Algeria

Uber Cup

Group A

Japan

India

Canada

Australia

Group B

Thailand

Chinese Taipei

Germany

Hong Kong

Group C

South Korea

Denmark

Russia

Mauritius

Group D

China

Indonesia

France

Malaysia

References 
Players

External links 
 Tournament Link
 Official Website

squads